Akaneyevo (Äkänäy) is a rural locality (a selo) in Staroyantuzovsky Selsoviet, Dyurtyulinsky District, Bashkortostan, Russia. The population was 283 as of 2010. There are 10 streets.

Geography 
Akaneyevo is located 22 km southeast of Dyurtyuli (the district's administrative centre) by road. Starobaishevo is the nearest rural locality.

References 

Rural localities in Dyurtyulinsky District